Qatar is scheduled to compete in the 2017 Asian Winter Games in Sapporo and Obihiro, Japan from February 19 to 26. 

Qatar is scheduled to compete in three sports. After competing in speed skating in its debut at the 2011 Games, this will mark the country's debut in all three sports it contests at this edition: curling, hockey and short track speed skating. Qatar's team will consist of 32 athletes.

On February 19, 2017 it was announced that ice hockey player Thamer Al Mohannadi would be the country's flagbearer during the parade of nations at the opening ceremony.

Competitors
The following table lists the Qatari delegation per sport and gender.

Curling

Qatar has entered a men's and women's team, each consisting of four athletes (for a total of eight).

Men's tournament

Nabeel Alyafei – Skip
Ahmed Al Fahad – Third
Jaber Al Ozali – Second
Ahmad Khashabi – Lead

Round-robin
Qatar has a bye in draw 3

Draw 1 
Saturday, February 18, 9:00

Draw 2
Saturday, February 18, 18:00

Draw 4
Monday, February 20, 13:30

Draw 5
Tuesday, February 21, 9:00

Draw 6
Tuesday, February 21, 18:00

Women's tournament

Maryam Binali – Skip
Hanan Al Boinin – Third
Mubarka Al Abdulla – Second
Dhabya Al Boinin – Lead

Round-robin
Qatar has a bye in draw 5

Draw 1 
Saturday, February 18, 13:30

Draw 2
Saturday, February 19, 9:00

Draw 3
Sunday, February 20, 9:00

Draw 4
Monday, February 20, 18:00

Ice hockey

Qatar has entered a men's team. The team will compete in the Division two. Qatar finished in seventh place (17th place overall) in division 2 of the competition.

Men's tournament

Qatar was represented by the following 21 athletes:

Mohamed Abdelaziz (G)
Ahmad Alsulaiti (G)
Eid Mohammed Al Kubaisi (D)
Abdulla Al Muhaizaa (D)
Mohammed Al Muhaizaa (D)
Mohamed Alkaabi (D)
Naif Alrumaihi (D)
Saad Naimi (D)
Turki Al Heidous (F)
Saoud Al Kuwari (F)
Thamer Al Mohannadi (F)
Saad Al Moslamani (F)
Ali Al Muhaizaa (F)
Jassim Al Sheeb (F)
Abdulrahman Alashqar (F)
Mohammed Alkhalaf (F)
Abdulla Alsulaiti (F)
Abdulaziz Fakhroo (F)
Ahmad Fakhroo (F)
Jassim Fakhroo (F)
Abdulla Mohammed (F)

Legend: G = Goalie, D = Defense, F = Forward
Group A

Short track speed skating

Qatar has entered three male short track speed skaters.

Men
Mubarak Al Mohannadi
Jumah Al Sulaiti
Mohammed Al Sahouti

References

Nations at the 2017 Asian Winter Games
Qatar at the Asian Winter Games
2017 in Qatari sport